The following list includes notable people who were born or have lived in the US city of Montpelier, Vermont.

Artists and authors 

 Frederick W. Adams, physician and author
 Michael Arnowitt, classical and jazz pianist
 Ruth Payne Burgess, painter
 Jessica Comolli, beauty queen
 Kathryn Davis, novelist
 Garrett Graff, editor and educator
 Rob Mermin, founder of Circus Smirkus
 Frank Miller, comic book writer and artist
 Anaïs Mitchell, singer-songwriter
 Angelia Thurston Newman, poet, author, lecturer
 Arthur E. Scott, photo-historian of US senate
 Daniel Pierce Thompson, author
 Samuel C. Upham, journalist and counterfeiter
 Thomas Waterman Wood, painter
 Eric Zencey, novelist and essayist

Military 

 John W. Clark, Union Army veteran and recipient of the Medal of Honor
 Dayton P. Clarke, Union Army veteran and recipient of the Medal of Honor
 Richard A. Cody, general, 31st Vice Chief of Staff of the United States Army
 Robert J. Coffey, Union Army veteran and recipient of the Medal of Honor
 Hannibal Day, Union Army brigadier general
 George Dewey, US Navy admiral
 William Charles Fitzgerald, US Navy lieutenant
 William W. Noyes, Union Army veteran and recipient of the Medal of Honor
 James Stevens Peck, American Civil War officer who later served as Adjutant General of the Vermont National Guard
 Francis V. Randall, Union Army officer in the American Civil War
 Stephen Thomas, Union Army brigadier general and recipient of the Medal of Honor

Politicians 

 James H. Agen, Wisconsin State Assemblyman
 George H. Amidon, Vermont State Treasurer
 Howard E. Armstrong, Secretary of State of Vermont
 George W. Barker, U.S. Marshal for Vermont, Judge of Maniwitoc County, Wisconsin
 Francis K. Brooks, majority leader of the Vermont House of Representatives and member of the Vermont Senate
 George W. Cate, U.S. congressman
 Augustine Clarke, Anti-Masonic Party leader and Vermont State Treasurer
 Jedd Philo Clark Cottrill, Wisconsin state senator
 Ann Cummings, Montpelier mayor and member of the Vermont Senate
 Madelyn Davidson, Vermont State Treasurer
 Luther C. Dodge, mayor of Burlington, Vermont
 Benjamin F. Fifield, lawyer who served as United States Attorney for the District of Vermont, 1869–1880
 Charles E. Gibson Jr., Vermont Attorney General
 Mary Hooper, state representative and mayor of Montpelier
 George Howes, Vermont State Treasurer
 Vincent Illuzzi, state senator
 Elisha P. Jewett, Vermont State Treasurer
 Levi R. Kelley, Vermont State Treasurer
 Patrick Leahy, U.S. senator, President pro tempore of the United States Senate
 Farrand F. Merrill, Secretary of State of Vermont
 Timothy Merrill, Secretary of State of Vermont
 Lucas Miltiades Miller, U.S. congressman from Wisconsin
 William Paddock, Wisconsin State Assembly
 John A. Page, Vermont State Treasurer
 Asahel Peck, 35th governor of Vermont
 Lucius Benedict Peck, U.S. congressman
 Andrew Perchlik, member of the Vermont Senate
 Clarence H. Pitkin, U.S. Attorney for Vermont and Washington County State's Attorney
 Charles W. Porter, Secretary of State of Vermont
 Samuel Prentiss, U.S. senator
 Theodore Prentiss, Wisconsin state assemblyman
 John H. Senter, U.S. Attorney for Vermont, Mayor of Montpelier, Vermont
 Jeb Spaulding, member of the Vermont Senate, Vermont State Treasurer, Vermont Secretary of Administration, Chancellor of the Vermont State Colleges
 John Spaulding, Vermont State Treasurer
 John Mellen Thurston, U.S. senator
 William Upham, U.S. senator
 Eliakim Persons Walton, U.S. congressman
 Anne Watson, mayor of Montpelier
 Charles W. Willard, U.S. congressman
 David Wing Jr., Secretary of State of Vermont

Law and judiciary
Nicholas Baylies, Justice of the Vermont Supreme Court
Louis P. Peck, Associate Justice of the Vermont Supreme Court
Marilyn Skoglund, Justice of the Vermont Supreme Court, notable for becoming an attorney and judge without attending law school
 Charles Tetzlaff, United States Attorney for the District of Vermont
John H. Watson, Chief Justice of the Vermont Supreme Court

Sports 

 Jim Laird, running back for several NFL teams
 Dave Moody, NASCAR commentator
 Amanda Pelkey, Team USA hockey team member
 Bob Yates, professional football player

References

Montpelier, Vermont
Montpelier